The Florida banded water snake (Nerodia fasciata pictiventris), a subspecies of the banded water snake (southern water snake - Nerodia fasciata), is a nonvenomous natricine colubrid native to the southeastern United States.

Geographic range
The Florida banded water snake is endemic throughout Florida South Carolina South Western and southeastern North Augusta, Beech Island, South West of Aiken County including areas running alongside Savannah River, Northern Georgia. In addition, it has been introduced to Brownsville, Texas. It has also established populations in Folsom and Harbor City, California.

Description
Dorsally, it is light brown or yellowish, with 26–35 reddish-brown to black crossbands. Ventrally, it is yellow or white, with reddish-brown or black markings. In large adult individuals, the ground color on the lower sides is sometimes darker than the crossbands, producing an appearance of alternating blotches on the back and sides.

The Florida water snake differs from the southern water snake (N. f. fasciata) chiefly in the shape of the markings on the ventrals. In N. f.pictiventris, these markings consist of transverse blotches, many of them enclosing an oval white spot, whereas in N. f. fasciata, they are solid, squarish spots.

Adults average  in total length.

Reproduction
They are ovoviviparous. Mating occurs from March to May, and the young are born from May to August, in broods of 25–57. The newborns are 180–223 mm (7.0–8.8 inches) in total length.

Gallery

Notes

 https://nas.er.usgs.gov/queries/FactSheet.asp?speciesID=1195

References
 Balfour, P.S., E.W. Stitt, M.M. Fuller, and T. K. Luckan. 2007. Nerodia fasciata pictiventris (Florida water snake). Herpetological Review 38:489.
 Cope, E.D. 1895. On some new North American Snakes. American Naturalist 29: 676–689. (Natrix fasciata pictiventris, pp. 677–678.)
 Fuller, M.M. and B.W. Trevett. 2006. Nerodia fasciata pictiventris (Florida water snake). Herpetological Review 37:363.

External links

 Florida Banded Watersnake
 Southern Banded Water Snakes
 

fasciata pictiventris
Reptiles of the United States
Species described in 1895
Fauna of the Southeastern United States